The Tisdale-Morse House is a historic house located at 17 Fayette Place in Taunton, Massachusetts.

Description and history 
This large -story, Greek Revival style house was built in 1835 for Samuel Tisdale, and is one of the last surviving estate houses in the city. It originally sat on a large estate, which was held through the 1870s by Lovett Morse, a bank president, before being subdivided for development. The house has a central-hall plan, and is set on a high brick foundation. It has a single-story porch supported by fluted columns, that wraps around two sides. The house has been subdivided into apartments.

The house was listed on the National Register of Historic Places on July 5, 1984.

See also
National Register of Historic Places listings in Taunton, Massachusetts

References

National Register of Historic Places in Taunton, Massachusetts
Houses in Taunton, Massachusetts
Houses on the National Register of Historic Places in Bristol County, Massachusetts
Houses completed in 1835
Greek Revival houses in Massachusetts